KPIO-FM (93.7 FM) is a radio station broadcasting a religious broadcasting music format. Licensed to Pleasanton, Kansas, United States. The station is currently owned by Catholic Radio Network.

References

External links
 

Radio stations established in 1972
Catholic radio stations
1972 establishments in Kansas
PIO-FM